Wen'an is a county in the central part of Hebei province, China, on the upper reaches of the Daqing River, a tributary of the Hai River, and bordering Tianjin to the east.

Administrative divisions
The county administers 12 towns and one ethnic township.

Towns:
Wen'an
Xinzhen
Suqiao
Daliuhe
Zuogezhuang
Tanli
Shigezhuang
Zhaogezhuang
Xinglonggong
Daliuzhen
Sunshi
Degui

The only township is Daweihe Hui and Manchu Ethnic Township

Climate

References

External links

County-level divisions of Hebei